Bodh Gayā is a religious site and place of pilgrimage associated with the Mahabodhi Temple Complex in Gaya district in the Indian state of Bihar. It is famous as it is the place where Gautama Buddha is said to have attained  Enlightenment under what became known as the Bodhi Tree. Since antiquity, Bodh Gaya has remained the object of pilgrimage and veneration both for Hindus and Buddhists. In particular, archaeological finds including sculptures show that the site was in use by Buddhists since the Mauryan period. 

For Buddhists, Bodh Gaya is the most important of the main four pilgrimage sites related to the life of Gautama Buddha, the other three being Kushinagar, Lumbini, and Sarnath. In 2002, Mahabodhi Temple, located in Bodh Gaya, became a UNESCO World Heritage Site.

History

Bodh Gaya is considered to be the holiest site in Buddhism. Known as Uruwela in the Buddha's time, it is situated by the bank of Lilajan River. The first temple at the site was built by King Ashoka.

Traditionally, Buddha was born in 563 BC on the following auspicious Baisakhi purnima. As Siddhartha, he renounced his family at the age of 29 in 534 BC, and travelled and meditated in search of truth. After practicing self-mortification for six years at Urubela (Buddhagaya) in Gaya, he gave up that practice because it did not give him Vimukthi. Then he discovered Noble Eight-fold path without help from anyone and practiced it, then he attained Buddhatva or enlightenment. Enlightenment is a state of being completely free from lust (raga), hatred (dosa) and delusion (moha). By gaining enlightenment, you enter Nirvana, in which the final stage is Parinirvana.

At this place, the Buddha was abandoned by the five men who had been his companions of earlier austerities. All they saw was an ordinary man; they mocked his well-nourished appearance. "Here comes the mendicant Gautama," they said, "who has turned away from asceticism. He is certainly not worth our respect." When they reminded him of his former vows, the Buddha replied, "Austerities only confuse the mind. In the exhaustion and mental stupor to which they lead, one can no longer understand the ordinary things of life, still less the truth that lies beyond the senses. I have given up extremes of either luxury or asceticism. I have discovered the Middle Way." This is the path which is neither easy (a rich prince) nor hard (living in austere conditions practicing self-denial). Hearing this, the five ascetics became the Buddha's first disciples in Deer Park, Sarnath, 13 kms north east of Benares.

The disciples of Gautama Siddhartha began to visit the place during the full moon in the month of Vaisakh (April–May), as per the Hindu calendar. Over time, the place became known as Bodh Gaya, the day of enlightenment as Buddha Purnima, and the tree as the Bodhi Tree.

The history of Bodh Gaya is documented by many inscriptions and pilgrimage accounts. Foremost among these are the accounts of the Chinese pilgrims Faxian in the 5th century and Xuanzang in the 7th century. The area was at the heart of a Buddhist civilization for centuries, until it was conquered by Turkic armies in the 13th century.
The place-name, Bodh Gaya, did not come into use until the 18th century CE. Historically, it was known as Uruvela, Sambodhi (Saṃ+bodhi, "Complete Enlightenment" in Ashoka's Major Rock Edict No.8), Vajrasana (the "Diamond Throne" of the Buddha) or Mahabodhi ("Great Enlightenment"). The main monastery of Bodh Gaya used to be called the Bodhimanda-vihāra (Pali). Now it is called the Mahabodhi Temple.

During the period from the 11th to 13th centuries, Bodh Gaya was under the control of local chieftains known as the Pithipatis of Bodh Gaya who were responsible for the management of the region. One of their rulers, Acarya Buddhasena, was noted as making a grant to Sri Lankan monks near the Mahabodhi temple.

Mahabodhi Temple

contains the Mahabodhi Temple with the Vajrasana or "diamond throne" and the holy Bodhi tree. This tree was originally a sapling of the Sri Maha Bodhi tree in Sri Lanka, itself grown from a what is claimed to be a sapling of the original Bodhi tree.

In approximately 250 BCE, about 200 years after the Buddha attained Enlightenment, Emperor Asoka visited Bodh Gaya in order to establish a monastery and shrine on the holy site.

Representations of this early temple are found at Sanchi, on the toraṇas of Stūpa I, dating from around 25 BCE, and on a relief carving from the stupa railing at Bhārhut, from the early Shunga period (c. 185–c. 73 BCE).

Other Buddhist temples

Kittisirimegha of Sri Lanka, a contemporary of Samudragupta, erected with the permission of Samudragupta, a Sanghārāma near the Mahabodhi Temple, chiefly for the use of the Singhalese monks who went to worship the Bodhi tree. The circumstances in connection with the Sanghārāma are given by Xuanzang (Beal, op. cit., 133ff) who gives a description of it as seen by himself. It was probably here that Buddhaghosa met the Elder Revata who persuaded him to come to Ceylon.

Several Buddhist temples and monasteries have been built by the people of Bhutan, Mongolia, China, Japan, Korea, Cambodia,  Laos, Myanmar, Nepal, Sikkim, Sri Lanka, Taiwan, Thailand, Tibet and Vietnam in a wide area around the Mahabodhi Temple. These buildings reflect the architectural style, exterior and interior decoration of their respective countries. The statue of Buddha in the Chinese temple is 200 years old and was brought from China. Japan's Nippon temple is shaped like a pagoda. The Myanmar (Burmese) temple is also pagoda shaped and is reminiscent of Bagan. The Thai temple has a typical sloping, curved roof covered with golden tiles. Inside, the temple holds a massive bronze statue of Buddha. Next to the Thai temple is 25-metre statue of Buddha located within a garden which has existed there for over 100 years.

Sujata Stupa
Across the Phalgu river is the Sujata Stupa, in the village of Bakraur. The stupa was dedicated to the milkmaid Sujata, who is said to have fed Gautama Buddha milk and rice as he was sitting under a Banyan tree, ending his seven years of fasting and asceticism, and allowing him to attain illumination through the Middle Way. The stupa was built in the 2nd century BCE as confirmed by finds of black polished wares and punch-marked coins in the attending monastery.

The Great Buddha Statue

The Great Buddha Statue also known as 80 feet statue is in Bodhgaya. The unveiling and consecration of the Great Buddha Statue took place on 18 November 1989. The consecration ceremony was attended by the 14th Dalai Lama, who blessed the 25-meter statue, the first great Buddha ever built in the history of India. The Statue is now a symbol of the holy place Bodhgaya, next to Mahabodhi Temple which is a World Heritage site, and enjoys constant visits of pilgrims from all over the world. Among local people, it is nicknamed "the 80-foot (25-meter) Buddha Statue."

Under the slogan "Spread Buddha's rays to the Whole World," Daijokyo spent seven years on construction of the Great Buddha Statue, mobilizing 120,000 masons in total.

Mahabodhi Temple bombings

On 7 July 2013, at around 05:15, a low intensity bomb blast took place in the 2500-year-old Mahabodhi Temple complex. This was followed by a series of nine low intensity blasts which resulted in two monks being injured; one was Tibetan and the other Burmese. These blasts were carried out by an Islamic terrorist organization called Indian Mujahideen. Two other bombs, one under the 80-foot statue of the Buddha and the other near Karmapa Temple were defused by the police.

On 1 June 2018, a special National Investigation Agency (NIA) court of Patna sentenced five suspects in the case to life imprisonment.

Demographics
As per the 2001 census, Bodh Gaya had a population of 30,883. Males constitute 54% of the population and females 46%. Bodh Gaya has an average literacy rate of 51%, lower than the national average of 59.5%; with male literacy of 63% and female literacy of 38%. 8% of the population is under 6 years of age.

Transportation

 Buses have been introduced by the BSTDC between Patna and Bodh Gaya via Rajgir.
A special caravan service called Wonder on Wheel, between Patna and Bodh Gaya, has been introduced by the Bihar Tourism Department.
Bodhgaya has restricted the use of auto rickshaws, cars and buses to make the pilgrimage site more peaceful. A permit is required for the use of cars and buses, and the only taxi available is an electric rickshaw that is mostly noiseless.

Sister cities
Bodh Gaya has one official sister city:
 Nara Prefecture, Japan

See also

 Cetiya
 Bodhgaya inscription of Mahanaman
 Sri Maha Bodhi
 Lumbini
 Sarnath
 Kusinagar
 Rajgir
 Bakraur
 Kurkihar hoard
 Buddhist pilgrimage
 Indian Institute of Management Bodh Gaya

References

Bibliography
Kinnard, Jacob N. (1998). When Is The Buddha Not the Buddha? The Hindu/Buddhist Battle over Bodhgayā and Its Buddha Image. Journal of the American Academy of Religion 66 (4), 817-839
Geary, David; Sayers, Matthew R; Amar, Abhishek Singh (2012). Cross-disciplinary perspectives on a contested Buddhist site: Bodh Gaya jataka. London, New York: Routledge

External links

 
 Detailed history of Bodhgaya by Ven. S. Dhammika.
 Bihar state tourism development corporation (BSTDC)
 Places to Visit in Bodh Gaya
Photos of Mahabodhi Temple & Bodhgaya

Bodhgaya Map

 
Articles containing potentially dated statements from 2001
Buddhist pilgrimage sites in India
Tourist attractions in Bihar
Buddhist sites in Bihar
Hindu pilgrimage sites in India
Hindu holy cities
Cities and towns in Gaya district
Religious tourism in India